Nevada State Route 42 may refer to:
Nevada State Route 42 (1935)
Nevada State Route 42 (1940s), which existed until the 1970s renumbering